Old Somerby (pronounced Summerby) is a village and civil parish in the South Kesteven district of Lincolnshire, England,  south-east of Grantham.

Structure
The civil parish population at the 2011 census was 224. Adjacent villages are Ropsley and Boothby Pagnell. The village divides into Old Somerby, High Somerby and Low Somerby.

Amenities
The church parish is part of The North Beltisloe Group of Beltisloe Deanery in the Diocese of Lincoln. Its church in High Somerby is dedicated to St Mary Magdalene, the same dedication as at nearby Bitchfield.

There is bed-and-breakfast accommodation in School Lane. The village public house is the Fox and Hounds in Grantham Road (B1176). Schools, shops and other amenities are available in Grantham (to which there are occasional daytime, weekday buses.

Heritage

Somerby was a colony of the Danes who ruled Lincolnshire after peace was made with King Alfred in 878. The village is listed in the Domesday Book, where the King's tenant-in-chief is given as Walter of Aincourt.

The village belonged to the historical wapentake of Winnibriggs and Threo. The population of the 51 houses in 1870–1872 was given as 234.

Historic buildings
The church is Grade II* listed. Initially from the 12th–15th centuries, it underwent alterations and additions in the 18th century and in 1876.

The Old Rectory in School Lane is Grade II listed and dates from about 1700, with alterations and additions in the late 18th, the 19th and the 20th centuries. The other Grade II listed buildings in the village are a barn at the Manor House, the Manor House itself, the stable block at Cold Harbour Farm, and the Old Farm House.

Near the church is the site of a moated manor house.

Notable people
Edward Weston (1703–1770), didactic writer and politician, purchased the parish of Somerby and lived at Somerby Hall, as did his descendants into the 1930s. His monument remains in the churchyard.
William Henry Brookfield (1809–1874), formerly inspector of schools and chaplain-in-ordinary to Queen Victoria, became Rector of Somerby-cum-Humby in 1865. Lord Tennyson, a friend, wrote a sonnet in his memory.

References

External links

"St Mary Magdalene, Old Somerby", Achurchnearyou.com

Villages in Lincolnshire
Civil parishes in Lincolnshire
South Kesteven District